Hamiltonella is a genus of Enterobacteria in the Gammaproteobacteria. Hamiltonella defensa is a model organism for defensive symbiosis, protecting pea aphids from parasitoid wasps. Hamiltonella has also been found as a nutritional mutualistic endosymbiont in Whiteflies.

References 

Enterobacteriaceae
Bacteria genera